Cochranville is a census-designated place (CDP) in West Fallowfield Township, Chester County, Pennsylvania, United States. The population was 668 at the 2010 census. It is the hometown of Olympic swimmer Cierra Runge.

Geography
Cochranville is located at  adjacent to the eastern border of West Fallowfield Township.  Pennsylvania Routes 10 and 41 intersect in Cochranville, Route 10 heading north to Parkesburg and southwest to Oxford, while Route 41 heads northwest to Atglen and Gap and southeast to Avondale.

Demographics

References

Census-designated places in Chester County, Pennsylvania
Census-designated places in Pennsylvania